Pygmeocossus tonga is a moth in the family Cossidae. It is found on the Andaman Islands of India.

References

Natural History Museum Lepidoptera generic names catalog

Cossinae